In American football, a spiral is the continuous in-flight rotation around the longitudinal axis of a football following its release from the hand of a passer or foot of a punter.

History
Pop Warner is credited for teaching his players both the spiral punt and the spiral pass.

Pass
The development of the forward pass is traced to Eddie Cochems and Bradbury Robinson at St. Louis. Howard R. Reiter also claimed to develop the overhand forward pass.

Punt
Alex Moffat invented the spiral punt, described by one writer as "a dramatic change from the traditional end-over-end kicks." He also invented the drop kick.

See also
Spiral
 Torpedo punt
 Forward pass

References

American football terminology